The Greatest Hits is an upcoming romantic musical film for Searchlight Pictures. Written, produced and directed by Ned Benson. The film is produced by Michael London and Shannon Gaulding, along with Benson, Stephanie Davis and Cassandra Kulukundis. The film is set to star Lucy Boynton, David Corenswet, Justin H. Min, and Austin Crute.

Synopsis
A love story, the film as been reported as an exploration of the connection between music and memory, and the power to transport people.

Cast
 Lucy Boynton
 David Corenswet
 Justin H. Min
 Jackson Kelly
 Austin Crute

Production
Ned Benson wrote and is set as director for the film. It is produced by Groundswell Productions’ Michael London and Shannon Gaulding, along with Stephanie Davis, Cassandra Kulukundis and Benson himself. In August 2022, Searchlight Pictures acquired the rights.

Casting
In August 2022 Lucy Boynton was added to the cast. That same month Justin H. Min was added to the cast. In October 2022 Austin Crute was added to the cast.

Filming
Principal photography took place in California in autumn 2022. Locations included Silver Lake, and San Pedro, Los Angeles.

References

External links

Upcoming films
Films shot in California